John Akin Salako (born 11 February 1969) is an English football coach, former professional player, and sports television pundit.

Born in Nigeria, Salako played as a midfielder from 1986 until 2005. He played in the Premier League for Crystal Palace, Coventry City, Bolton Wanderers and Charlton Athletic, and in the Football League for Swansea City, Fulham, Reading and Brentford. He represented England at senior level, earning five caps, all during 1991 while he was a Crystal Palace player.

From 2009 to 2015, alongside his punditry work, Salako coached within Crystal Palace's youth academy as well as for a spell with the first team.

Playing career
A fast and imaginative player, Salako began his career at Crystal Palace in the mid 1980s, and was their regular left winger by the time they won promotion to the First Division in 1989. He was also in the side for the 1990 FA Cup Final, picking up a runners-up medal after they drew 3–3 with Manchester United before losing the replay 1–0. A year later, he helped Palace finish third in the league. Late in the 1990–91 season, he memorably scored twice for Palace in their 3–0 home win over Manchester United in the league.

However, a serious knee injury suffered in a league match against Leeds United ruled him out until the following season, when Palace were founder members of the FA Premier League but finished the season relegated, with Salako often being positioned as a centre forward alongside Chris Armstrong after the sale of Ian Wright and Mark Bright. Salako helped them get straight back up, but they went down again the following season despite reaching the semi-finals of both cups.

Salako left Palace in the summer of 1995, signing for Coventry City. He spent three seasons at Coventry, spending a brief period on loan at Bolton Wanderers, before signing for Fulham in Division Two. At Fulham he scored twice, once in the league against Macclesfield, and again in the League Cup against Cardiff City. After Fulham he played for Charlton Athletic and Reading, before ending his career at Brentford.

Coaching career
He has coached Crystal Palace under 16 team, working with former teammate Bright. On 8 August 2015, he was announced as Crystal Palace first team coach. In 2005, Salako was voted into Palace's Centenary XI.

Media career
Salako previously worked as a matchday correspondent on Sky Sports.

Personal life
As a teenager, he lived in Westerham, Kent and was a student at The Wildernesse School in Sevenoaks. His brother Andy Salako was also a professional footballer.

Honours

As a player 
Crystal Palace
 Football League First Division: 1993–94
 Football League Second Division play-offs: 1989

Fulham
 Football League Second Division: 1998–99

Charlton Athletic
 Football League First Division: 1999–2000

Reading
 Football League Second Division runner-up: 2001–02

individual
 Crystal Palace Young Player of the Year: 1986–87, 1987–88

See also
 List of England international footballers born outside England

References

External links

Official Blog

1969 births
Living people
English footballers
England international footballers
English people of Nigerian descent
English people of Yoruba descent
Naturalised citizens of the United Kingdom
Premier League players
English Football League players
Brentford F.C. players
Charlton Athletic F.C. players
Reading F.C. players
Fulham F.C. players
Bolton Wanderers F.C. players
Coventry City F.C. players
Swansea City A.F.C. players
Crystal Palace F.C. players
Nigerian emigrants to the United Kingdom
Yoruba sportspeople
People from Westerham
Sportspeople from Ibadan
Association football midfielders
Crystal Palace F.C. non-playing staff
FA Cup Final players
Association football coaches